Liparia is a genus of flowering plants in the legume family, Fabaceae. It belongs to the subfamily Faboideae.

Species
Liparia comprises the following species:

Section Decussatae

 Liparia bonaespei A. L. Schutte
 Liparia boucheri E. G. H. Oliv. & Fellingham) A. L. Schutte
 Liparia calycina (L. Bolus) A. L. Schutte
 Liparia capitata Thunb.
 Liparia congesta A. L. Schutte
 Liparia laevigata (L.) Thunb.
 Liparia latifolia (Benth.) A. L. Schutte
 Liparia myrtifolia Thunb.
 Liparia rafnioides A. L. Schutte

 Liparia umbellifera Thunb.
 Liparia vestita Thunb.

Section Liparia

 Liparia angustifolia (Eckl. & Zeyh.) A. L. Schutte

 Liparia confusa A. L. Schutte

 Liparia genistoides (Lam.) A. L. Schutte
 †Liparia graminifolia L.
 Liparia hirsuta Thunb.
 Liparia parva Vogel ex Walp.
 Liparia racemosa A. L. Schutte

 Liparia splendens (Burm. f.) Bos & de Wit
 subsp. comantha (Eckl. & Zeyh.) Bos & de Wit
 subsp. splendens (Burm. f.) Bos & de Wit
 Liparia striata A. L. Schutte

Nomina dubia

 Liparia hybrida Steud.
 Liparia opposita L.

 Liparia sericea (L.) E. Mey.

References

Podalyrieae
Fabaceae genera